Ajax is a federal electoral district in the Durham Region of Ontario.

Ajax was created by the 2012 riding redistribution from the portion of Ajax—Pickering consisting of the entire town of Ajax, Ontario, and was legally defined in the 2013 representation order. It came into effect in time for the 2015 Canadian federal election.

Demographics 
According to the 2021 Canada Census

Ethnic groups: 34.1% White, 26.2% South Asian, 16.8% Black, 5.3% Filipino, 3.0% West Asian, 3.0% Chinese, 2.0% Arab, 1.3% Latin American, 1.3% Indigenous

Languages: 64.8% English, 5.0% Tamil, 3.7% Urdu, 2.2% Tagalog, 1.5% Dari, 1.2% Gujarati, 1.2% Arabic, 1.1% French, 1.0% Punjabi, 1.0% Spanish, 1.0% Mandarin

Religions: 50.8% Christian (22.2% Catholic, 3.7% Pentecostal, 3.5% Anglican, 2.5% Christian Orthodox, 2.1% United Church, 1.3% Baptist, 1.1% Presbyterian, 14.4% None), 14.1% Muslim, 11.6% Hindu, 1.3% Sikh, 20.8% None

Median income: $42,400 (2020)

Average income: $54,300 (2020)

Members of Parliament
This riding has elected the following members of the House of Commons of Canada:

Election results

References

Ontario federal electoral districts
Ajax, Ontario
2013 establishments in Ontario